Semi Scott Wara (born 22 September 1999) is a Fijian footballer who plays as a defender for  club Leek Town and the Fiji national team.

Early and personal life
Wara was born in Lautoka, Fiji and moved to Staffordshire, England at a young age. His father served with the British Army. His brother Billy is a rugby player; Scott also played rugby at school before switching to football.

Club career
Wara began his career with Stoke City, playing for the U21 team in the EFL Trophy. He moved on a one-month loan to Leek Town in December 2017, making two league appearances. Wara was released by Stoke City in July 2020.

Wara went on trial with Premier League club Newcastle United in November 2020, having previously been on trial at National League club Wrexham. He subsequently returned to Leek Town on a permanent basis in 2021, first appearing as an unused substitute against Trafford on 17 August, before making his debut in the FA Cup win against Gresley Rovers four days later.

International career
Wara is eligible to represent either Fiji or England at international level. He received his first call-up to the Fiji senior national team in March 2018. He made his debut on 5 September 2018, in a 1–1 draw against the Solomon Islands, appearing as a half-time substitute for Narendra Rao. In September 2019 he joined the Fiji under-23 team.

Career statistics

Club

International

References

External links
 

1999 births
Living people
Sportspeople from Lautoka
Fijian emigrants to England
Fijian footballers
English footballers
Association football defenders
Stoke City F.C. players
Leek Town F.C. players
Northern Premier League players
Fiji international footballers